Pekka Pökälä (born 29 January 1948 in Asikkala) is a Finnish ski-orienteering competitor and world champion. He won a gold medal at the first World Ski Orienteering Championships in Hyvinkää in 1975 in the relay event with the Finnish team (with Heimo Taskinen, Jorma Karvonen and Olavi Svanberg). He received an individual silver medal in 1977.

See also
 Finnish orienteers
 List of orienteers
 List of orienteering events

References

1948 births
Living people
Finnish orienteers
Male orienteers
Ski-orienteers